The Mikoyan-Gurevich Ye-8 was a supersonic jet fighter developed in the Soviet Union, intended to replace the MiG-21 (originally named MiG-23). Only two prototypes were built in 1960-61. The original MiG-21's air intakes were moved under the fuselage, freeing up the nose where a larger and more powerful radar, able to deliver longer range air-to-air missiles, could be built in. Canards were built to both sides of the nose, in front of the cockpit, (the horizontal stabilizers of MiG-21 were left at their original position).

The two prototypes flew in 1962. On 11 September 1962, the Tumansky R-21F-300 engine, also under development, exploded in midair at a speed of Mach 2.15.  Test pilot Georgy Konstantinovich Mosolov, then one of the leading Soviet test pilots, was severely injured by debris from the compressor and had to eject at Mach 1.78.

Due to unsolved technical problems, the aircraft's development was abandoned; some parts were used on the MiG-23, including R-23 missiles and their associated Sapfir-23 radar.

Specifications

See also

References

External links

 
 

Ye-008
1960s Soviet fighter aircraft
Abandoned military aircraft projects of the Soviet Union
Single-engined jet aircraft
Mid-wing aircraft
Aircraft first flown in 1962